Józef Jerzy Dankowski (born 16 March 1960) is a Polish football coach and a former player who most recently managed Wilki Wilcza.

History
Dankowski began his career with Górnik Zabrze, a club for whom he would play several seasons in the Polish Ekstraklasa. He had a spell with Larissa in the Greek Super League.

After he retired from playing, Dankowski became a football manager. He led his former club Górnik Zabrze on multiple occasions.

References

1960 births
Living people
Polish footballers
Górnik Zabrze players
Polonia Warsaw players
Stal Stalowa Wola players
Athlitiki Enosi Larissa F.C. players
Polish football managers
Górnik Zabrze managers
GKS Bełchatów managers
Piast Gliwice managers
People from Inowrocław County
Sportspeople from Kuyavian-Pomeranian Voivodeship
Association football defenders
Poland international footballers
Polish expatriate footballers
Expatriate footballers in Greece
Polish expatriate sportspeople in Greece
Ekstraklasa managers